Rusty Rivets is a Canadian 3D CGI animated television series, and is produced by Arc Productions and Spin Master Entertainment. Rusty Rivets aired for three seasons, simultaneously on Treehouse TV in Canada and on Nickelodeon in the U.S., from November 8, 2016, to May 8, 2020. Inspired by elements of the maker culture, it follows the adventures of a young inventor named Rusty and his team of customized robots.

The first season was the last animated project of Arc Productions before it was absorbed into Jam Filled Toronto in August 2016.

Plot
A young boy named Rusty Rivets uses his knowledge of engineering to repurpose machine parts and create gadgets. He lives in the city of Sparkton Hills along with his friend Ruby Ramirez, a robotic tyrannosaurid named Botasaur, and a group of smaller robots known as the Bits. The show highlights a variety of concepts related to basic science and technology.

Rusty uses the recurring catch phrase "modify, customize, Rustify" when personalizing inventions. Ruby changes the last word to "Rubify" when she does the alterations (only once), and Liam changes the last word to "Liamify" when he does it (also only once).

Episodes

Characters

Main
Rusty Rivets (voiced by Kyle Harrison Breitkopf in US, and Theo Crabb-LaHei in UK) is an engineer. He has his own mobile laboratory, which is based in a recycling yard. He is the great great grandson of Ruston Rivets IV, which Ruby guesses hearing the number, indicating he is Ruston Rivets VIII, although there are conflicting ideas about the name of Ruston Rivets IV, since in Season 3, Rusty also called him Mortimer Rivets.
Ruby Ramirez (voiced by Ava Preston in US, and Imogen Addicott in UK) is Rusty's best friend who normally carries a tablet computer that she uses to call the Bits into action. Ruby wears a red sash with white dots around her head, reminiscent of Rosie the Riveter.
Frankie Fritz (voiced by Jacob Skiba in US, and Fraser Martin in UK) is Rusty and Ruby's rival, arch-enemy and neighbor, using every opportunity he can to try and upstage Rusty and be the best engineer in Sparkton Hills, even resorting to cheating to accomplish it.
Frankford is Frankie's robotic skunk, best friend and counterpart to Bytes. He helps Frankie in his attempts to put Rusty out of action.
Bytes (voiced by Robert Tinkler) is Rusty's robotic dog, who communicates by barking. He generally does not take part in missions.
Kittybot is Ruby's robotic cat, who communicates by meowing. She can sit down.
Ray (voiced by Robert Tinkler) is a small, red-coloured member of the Bits with a single eye that functions as a flashlight.
Whirly (voiced by Julie Lemieux) is a pink Bit who resembles a hummingbird. She has a pair of wings and a propeller on her head.
Crush (voiced by Julie Lemieux) is an orange Bit made from a clamp, who can crush and hold small objects.
Jack (voiced by Ron Pardo) is a blue, cube-shaped Bit who can lift and transport objects using his forklift-like arms.
Botasaur (voiced by Robert Tinkler) is the tallest member of Rusty's team, modeled after Tyrannosaurus rex. He is Rusty's sidekick.
Botarilla (voiced by Andrew Jackson) is Rusty's robotic gorilla, who can climb on trees and swing on vines.
TigerBot (voiced by Nicki Burke) is Rusty's robotic tiger, who can climb with her tiger claws.
ElephantBot (voiced by Scott Jackson) is Rusty's robotic elephant, who can spray water on his trumpet.

Recurring
Liam (voiced by Samuel Faraci and Jonathan  Michael  Sturgess in US, and Endeavour Clutterbuck in UK and Canada) is a young blonde-haired boy who often needs rescuing.
Emily (voiced by Aaliyah Cinello in US, and Amelie Halls in UK) is a young girl introduced in Season 2, who is a friend of Liam.
Ranger Anna (voiced by Helen King in US, and Niki Felstead in UK) is a redheaded animal enthusiast in charge of the Sparkton Hills Scouts which Rusty and Ruby are part of.
Chef Betty (voiced by Novie Edwards in Season 1) and Teacher Betty (voiced by Nicole Stamp in Season 2 and 3) is a culinary expert (Season 1) and later a teacher at the school where Rusty, Ruby, and Frankie go to (Season 2 and 3).
Sammy Scoops (voiced by Joshua Graham in US, and Andy Turvey in UK) is an ice cream vendor.
Samantha (aka Cream Queen and Cone Woman) (voiced by Katie Griffin) shares the nickname "Sammy". They go into business together in "Captain Scoops" and are shown playing soccer together in "Rusty's Spaceship".
Mr. Higgins (voiced by James Rankin in US, and Chris Garner in UK) is the first inventor in town who inspired Rusty.
Officer Carl (voiced by Jonathan Potts in US, and Chris Garner in UK) is the only police officer in Sparkton Hills.
Mrs. Rivets (voiced by unknown in US, and Niki Felstead in UK) is Rusty's mother.
Mrs. McCloud (voiced by unknown) is Liam's mother. (unverified.)
Orbit (voiced by unknown) is Rusty's satellite after he crashed into the ground and Rusty launched him back into space.
Frankasaurus (voiced by Ian Ho) is Frankie's former younger robot dinosaur brother.
Robo-Squirrel (voiced by unknown) is Rusty's robotic squirrel who can destroy things by taking nuts out.
Chompers (voiced by Andrew Sabiston) is Rusty's pet beaver who can wag with her beaver tail.

Production
Rusty Rivets began development in late 2014. The concept was originally pitched to Guru Studio, which ultimately chose not to develop the show. The first season was produced in accordance with Spin Master's policy to work on 1-2 television programs a year. It is Spin Master's sixth animated television venture. Twenty-six episodes have been confirmed.

Most of the first season's episodes were animated by Arc Productions in Toronto, Ontario. The studio closed on August 2, 2016, but its assets have been sold to the Ottawa-based company Jam Filled Entertainment, and the business reopened on August 22, 2016, as Jam Filled Toronto.

On May 24, 2017, it was renewed for a second season.  On May 22, 2018, it was renewed for a third season.

Release
The series was announced at Nickelodeon's upfront presentation in New York City on March 2, 2016. It was originally slated to premiere in the United States on August 22, 2016, but it was pushed back to November 8, 2016. The first season was going to air on Treehouse TV in Canada throughout fall 2016, but it was delayed until January 16, 2017. Spin Master distributes the series and its product line globally. The series premiered on Nick Jr. in Israel on February 12, 2017.

As of December 2018, new episodes moved to the Nick Jr. channel.

Home media
On June 11, 2016, the first episode was released to Amazon Video as a free preview. The same episode was released to Nickelodeon's mobile platforms on June 20, 2016.

Nickelodeon and Paramount Home Entertainment released the DVD of the show on July 31, 2018.

Merchandise
Spin Master has announced that it will distribute a line of toys based on the program. The company released them in fall 2017.

Lawsuit
In 2019, an author sued Spin Master, claiming Rusty Rivets infringe the copyrights of 20-year-old comic book. Eventually Spin Master won when the judge declared that the TV series and comic book are not too similar.

References

External links

  (archived)
 Nick Jr. website (archived)
 

Animated television series about robots
Animated television series about children
2010s Canadian animated television series
2020s Canadian animated television series
2016 Canadian television series debuts
2020 Canadian television series endings
Canadian children's animated comic science fiction television series
Canadian computer-animated television series
English-language television shows
Nick Jr. original programming
Canadian preschool education television series
Animated preschool education television series
2010s preschool education television series
2020s preschool education television series
Treehouse TV original programming
Canadian children's animated action television series
Canadian children's animated science fantasy television series
Television series by Jam Filled Entertainment